

The CASA C-202 Halcón was a twin-engine transport aircraft, constructed by CASA.

The Halcón was designed for use on Spain's international air routes. It had tricycle landing gear and a heated/air-conditioned cabin which could accommodate fourteen passengers.  Twenty aircraft were initially ordered, and delivered to the Spanish Air Force with the designation T.6.

Operators

 Spanish Air Force

Specifications (CASA-202)

See also

References

 

1950s Spanish military transport aircraft
CASA aircraft
Low-wing aircraft
Aircraft first flown in 1952
Twin piston-engined tractor aircraft